Aphanosperma is genus of flowering plant in the family Acanthaceae containing a single species, Aphanosperma sinaloensis. It is endemic to Mexico. The species is self-compatible and autogamous.

References

Acanthaceae
Flora of Mexico
Acanthaceae genera
Monotypic Lamiales genera
Taxa named by Thomas Franklin Daniel